Sergey Aleksandrovich Nefedov (born November 4, 1951) is a Russian historian, Doctor of Sciences in Historical Sciences (2007), Candidate of Sciences in physico-mathematical sciences (1981), leading researcher at the Institute of History and Archaeology of the Ural branch of the Russian Academy of Sciences.
He also is a professor at the Ural Federal University.

In 1968 he entered and in 1973 he graduated from the Ural State University, Mathematics and Mechanics Faculty.
From 1973 to 1975, he was a graduate student at Ural State University.
He was a student of Nikolay Krasovsky.

He has twice received 'Public Thought Award' (2008, 2011). He also received the Academician Rychkov Award (2011). He is a Novy Mir magazine award winner (2016).

Author of more than 300 publications, including several monographs. He published in Voprosy Istorii, Russian History, Herald of the Russian Academy of Sciences, Voprosy Ekonomiki, Social Evolution & History, Economics & Sociology.

He is co-author (with Peter Turchin) of “Secular Cycles” (Princeton University Press, 2009), reviewed by William R. Thompson, Laura Panza, and Brian J. L. Berry.

He is a regular contributor to the magazine Novy Mir.

He's into snorkeling.

References

Living people
1951 births
Ural State University alumni 
Academic staff of Ural State University 
Academic staff of Ural Federal University 
Russian professors
Historians of Russia